Lisa Dal Bello is a self-titled album by Canadian singer Lisa Dalbello.  It was released in 1977 and began Dalbello's debut at the age of 17.  The album was produced by David Foster and won the Juno Award for Most Promising Female Vocalist.

Track listing

Personnel
Lisa Dal Bello - lead vocals, backing vocals; string arrangement on "Touch Me" and "Everything Money Can Buy"
Eddie Patterson, Jay Graydon, Jay Lewis, Steve Lukather, Larry Carlton - guitar
Mike Porcaro, "Pops" Popwell, David Hungate - bass
David Foster - Fender Rhodes piano, piano, Clavinet, rhythm arrangements
Charles Mims Jr. - Oberheim synthesizer
Richard Baker - Oberheim synthesizer, Moog synthesizer
David Paich - Moog synthesizer
Jeffrey Porcaro - drums, percussion
Nigel Olsson - drums on "Everything Money Can Buy"
Philip Bailey - percussion on "Day Dream"
Israel Baker - violin on "Touch Me"
The Seawind Horns - horns
Tom Scott - saxophone solo on "Stay With Me"
Brian Russell - devil's vocal on "Talk It Over (Even Though My Body's Cold)"
Bill Champlin, Brian Russell, Roy Galloway, Carmen Twillie, Venette Gloud, Jay Gruska, Michelle Gruska, Patrice Rushen, Steve Lukather - backing vocals
Technical
Jay Lewis, Matt Hyde, Keith Olsen – engineer
Linda Tyler - second engineer
George Osaki - art direction
Olivier Ferrand - photography

CD
Lisa Dal Bello, UICY-3059, Universal Japan (2000-12-20).
Lisa Dal Bello, UICY-94654, Universal Japan (2011-12-29), cardboard sleeve (mini LP), SHM-CD, limited release.

References 

1977 debut albums
Lisa Dalbello albums
Albums produced by David Foster
MCA Records albums